The Hunan–Guizhou railway or Xiangqian railway, is a double-track electrified railroad in Southwest China linking Zhuzhou, Hunan, with Guiyang, Guizhou. The railway runs through a very mountainous region, 23% of its length were either bridges or tunnels. Since 2006, it is one of the four segments of the Shanghai–Kunming railway.

Construction began in 1937, but was abandoned in 1939 during the Second Sino–Japanese War due to Japanese encroachment in Hunan. It was resumed in 1970 during the Cultural Revolution after Mao Zedong called for its construction. The line was only completed in 1972 after mobilizing hundreds of thousands of people, including workers, peasants, "sent-down youths", and soldiers.

Railway lines in China
Rail transport in Hunan
Rail transport in Guizhou
Railway lines opened in 1972